The 1903 Open Championship was the 43rd Open Championship, held 10–11 June at Prestwick Golf Club in Prestwick, South Ayrshire, Scotland. Harry Vardon won the Championship for the fourth time, six strokes ahead of runner-up Tom Vardon, his younger brother.

All entries played 36 holes on the first day with all those within 19 strokes of the leader making the cut and playing 36 holes on the final day, with the additional provision that the final day's field had to contain at least 32 professionals.

After the opening round on Wednesday morning, Harry Vardon and defending champion Sandy Herd co-led at 73, three strokes ahead of the rest of the field. In the afternoon, Herd had a poor 83 and Harry Vardon's 77 gave him a four shot lead on 150 ahead of Andrew Scott, despite a seven at the 17th hole. The cut was at 169 and 59 advanced to the final two rounds. Rowland Jones was initially disqualified but later reinstated.

In the third round on Thursday morning, Harry Vardon scored 72, having reached the turn in 34. This gave him a seven-stroke lead over Jack White, with Herd and Tom Vardon ten shots behind. In the afternoon, White took a seven at the third hole which effectively gave Harry Vardon the title. Playing cautiously, he eventually finished with a 78. Tom Vardon had the best final round score of 74 and moved into second place ahead of White.

Past champions in the field 

Source:

Did not enter: John Ball (1890), Jack Burns (1888).

Round summaries

First round
Wednesday, 10 June 1903 (morning)

Source:

Second round
Wednesday, 10 June 1903 (afternoon)

Source:

Third round
Thursday, 11 June 1903 (morning)

Source:

Final round
Thursday, 11 June 1903 (afternoon)

Source:

References

External links
Prestwick 1903 (Official site)

The Open Championship
Golf tournaments in Scotland
Open Championship
Open Championship
Open Championship